Centre Stage: The Very Best of Elaine Paige is a compilation album by Elaine Paige, released on 4 October 2004.

Background 
The album features tracks primarily taken from her back catalogue with Warner Music, and was released by WSM (Warner Special Markets). It is the second compilation album to be subtitled "The Very Best of Elaine Paige" after On Reflection: The Very Best of Elaine Paige.

The tracks "Something in Red" and "I Didn't Know I Was Saying Goodbye" were recorded for this album and produced by Bobby Huff. The tracks "Change the World", "From the Heart", "One More Time", "Somebody Make Me Laugh", "Is It Me" and "Kind to Animals" were recorded in 2000 and produced by Mike Moran for an album that was planned but never released.

The live recordings of "Miss You Nights" and "Let It Be Me", both duets with Cliff Richard, are taken from DVD of his 1999 London concert Live in the Park.

Artwork and packaging 
The two disc album was issued in a single jewel case with a cardboard sleeve. The discs had full colour labels. The album was designed by Mental Block and featured photography by Paul Cox.

Track listing

Disc One 
 "Something in Red" – 4:35 (Angela Kaset)
 Producer – Bobby Huff
 "Memory" – 4:15 (Andrew Lloyd Webber, T.S. Eliot, Trevor Nunn) – from the soundtrack of Cats
 Producers – Andrew Lloyd Webber and Nigel Wright
 Engineer – Robin Sellars
 "I Know Him So Well" – Duet with Barbara Dickson – 4:15 (Benny Andersson, Tim Rice, Björn Ulvaeus) – from the album Chess
 Producers – Benny Andersson, Björn Ulvaeus and Tim Rice
 Engineer – Michael B. Tretow
 "Miss You Nights" (live) – Duet with Cliff Richard – 4:11 (Dave Townsend) – from the soundtrack of Cliff Richard's DVD Live in the Park
 Producer – Brian Klein
 Recorded by Keith Bessey
 "The Perfect Year" – 3:21 (Andrew Lloyd Webber, Christopher Hampton, Don Black) – from the musical Sunset Boulevard and the album Encore
 Producers – Andrew Lloyd Webber and Nigel Wright
 Engineer – by Robin Sellars
 "September Song" (live) – 4:02 (Kurt Weill, Maxwell Anderson)
 Producer – Stella Hanson
 "Non, je ne regrette rien" – 3:42 (Charles Dumont, Michel Vaucaire) – from the album Piaf
 Producer – Mike Moran
 Arranger – Del Newman
 Engineer – Tony Taverner
 "Another Suitcase in Another Hall" – 3:27 (Andrew Lloyd Webber, Tim Rice) – from the album Stages
 Producer and Orchestral Arrangement Tony Visconti
 Rhythm Arrangement – Robin Smith
 Engineers – Bryan Evans, Chris Porter and Keith Grant
 "Change the World" – 3:51 (Andrew Lloyd Webber, T.S. Eliot, Trevor Nunn)
 Producer – Mike Moran
 "Cry Me a River" (live) – 4:58 (Tommy Sims, Gordon Kennedy, Wayne Kirkpatrick) - recorded during the BBC television series Parkinson
 "From the Heart" – 4:53 (Diane Warren)
 Producer – Mike Moran
 "Wishin' on a Star" – 3:52 (Billie Rae Calvin) – from the album Christmas
 Producer and Strings Arrangement – Tony Visconti
 Orchestral Arrangement and Musical Director – Robin Smith
 Assistant Engineer – Sam Smith
 Mixed by Sid Wells and Tony Visconti
 "I Dreamed a Dream" (live) – 4:19 (Claude-Michel Schonberg, Alain Boublil, Herbert Kretzmer) – from the album Encore
 Producer – Stella Hanson
 "Don't Cry for Me Argentina" – 5:49 (Andrew Lloyd Webber, Tim Rice) – from the album Evita: Original London Cast Recording
 Producers – Andrew Lloyd Webber and Tim Rice
 Engineer – David Hamilton-Smith
 "One More Time" – 4:12 (Richard Marx)
 Producer – Mike Moran
 "Hymne a L'Amour (If You Love Me)" – 2:53 (Edith Piaf, Marguerite Monnot, Geoffrey Parsons) – from the album Piaf
 Producer – Mike Moran
 Arranger – Del Newman
 Engineer – Tony Taverner
 "On My Own" – 3:49 (Claude-Michel Schonberg, Alain Boublil, Herbert Kretzmer, Trevor Nunn, John Caird) – from the album Memories: The Best of Elaine Paige 
 Producer – Tony Visconti
 "The Rose" – 3:45 (Amanda McBroom) – from the album Cinema
 Producer – Tony Visconti
 "Ave Maria" – 3:57 (J. S. Bach, Charles Gounod) – from the album Christmas
 Producer – Mike Batt

Disc Two 
 "I Didn't Know I Was Saying Goodbye" – 4:22 (Angela Kaset, Lee Thomas Miller)
 "Let It Be Me" (live) – Duet with Cliff Richard – 3:47 (Gilbert Becaud, Pierre Delanoe, Manny Curtis) – from the soundtrack of Cliff Richard's DVD Live in the Park
 "La Vie en rose" – 2:44 (Edith Piaf, Louiguy) – from the album Piaf
 "Somebody Make Me Laugh" – 4:05 ( – )
 "As If We Never Said Goodbye" – 5:20 (Andrew Lloyd Webber, Christopher Hampton, Don Black, Amy Powers) – from the musical Sunset Boulevard and the album Encore
 "With One Look" – 3:30 (Andrew Lloyd Webber, Christopher Hampton, Don Black, Amy Powers) – from the musical Sunset Boulevard and the album Encore
 "How Long Has This Been Going On?" – 3:44 (George Gershwin, Ira Gershwin) – from the album Romance & the Stage
 "This Is Where I Came In" – 3:44 (Phil Galdston, Wendy Waldman) – from the album Love Hurts
 "Unchained Melody" – 3:44 (Alex North, Hy Zaret) – from the album Cinema
 "Mon Dieu" – 3:49 (Charles Dumont, Michel Vaucaire) – from the album Piaf
 "For You" – 2:53 (Judie Tzuke, Mike Paxman) – from the album Love Hurts
 "Alfie" – 2:52 (Burt Bacharach, Hal David) – from the album Cinema
 "I Only Have Eyes for You" – 4:08 (Harry Warren, Al Dubin) – from the album Love Can Do That
 "Je Sais Comment (All This I Know)" – 3:31 (Julien Bouque, Robert Chauvign, Norman Newel, Hal Shaper) – from the album Piaf
 "Is It Me" – 4:27 ( – )
 "All Things Considered" – 3:42 (Vangelis, Tim Rice, Elaine Paige) – from the album Love Hurts
 "Shaking You" – 3:53 (David Foster, Paul Gordon, Tom Keane) – from the album Love Hurts
 "Kind to Animals" – 4:16 ( – )
 "Les Trois Cloches (The Three Bells)" – 3:56 (Jean Villard Gilles/Bert Reisfeld) - from the album Piaf

Personnel

Musicians 
 Elaine Paige – vocals
 Barbara Dickson – vocals
 Cliff Richard – vocals

Production 
 Mastered by Jon Astley at Close to the Edge
 Distributed by The Entertainment Network
 Design by Mental Block
 Photography by Paul Cox

References

External links

2004 compilation albums
Elaine Paige albums
Albums produced by Andrew Lloyd Webber
Albums produced by Nigel Wright
Albums produced by Tony Visconti